Macrotermes convulsionarius is a species of termite of the family Termitidae. It is native to India and Sri Lanka. Soldiers are very large with well developed mandibles. It is a major pest of many wood works in buildings. Flagellated bacteria such as Bacillus, Acinitobacter, Salmonella, Enterobacter, and Enterococcus are found abundant in gut of M. convulsionarius.

References

External links
Metabolic Influx and Energy Investment in Macrotermes convulsionarius (könig)
Studies on the development of captive termite colonies
http://www.indianjournals.com/ijor.aspx?target=ijor:apps&volume=19&issue=2&article=068

Termites
Insects of India
Insects of Sri Lanka
Insects described in 1779